The men's 10,000 metres at the 2016 European Athletics Championships were held at the Olympic Stadium on 8 July.

Records

Schedule

Results

Final

References

External links
 amsterdam2016.org, official championship site.

10000 M
10,000 metres at the European Athletics Championships